Silja Ekeland Bjørkly (born 22 June 1976 in Bergen) is a Norwegian politician for the Conservative Party.

She served as a deputy representative in the Norwegian Parliament from Hordaland during the term 2001–2005. During this entire term she sat as a regular representative, replacing Erna Solberg who was appointed to the second cabinet Bondevik.

Bjørkly was a deputy member of Bergen city council from 1999 to 2001.

References

1976 births
Living people
Conservative Party (Norway) politicians
Politicians from Bergen
Women members of the Storting
Members of the Storting
21st-century Norwegian politicians
21st-century Norwegian women politicians